The Miss Universe Slovenia is a national beauty pageant that selected Slovenia's representative to the Miss Universe pageant.

History
In 2001 Slovenia began to participate in the Miss Universe history. Minka Alagič was crowned a very first Miss Universe Slovenia pageant. In 2012, the main national pageant organizer "Delo Revije", a magazine company, lost the franchise license due to company's bankruptcy filed in 2011. In 2013, the franchise was acquired by "Vladimir Kraljevic", who is also the national director of Miss Universe Croatia. On March 30, 2017 "Sejem kozmetike in Lepote" had a right to control a new Miss Universe Slovenia to be an ambassador in Miss Universe history.

The Miss Universe Slovenia has officially broadcast on TV3 Slovenija.

In Mexico City, where Miss Universe 2007 was held, Tjaša Kokalj, Miss Universe Slovenia 2007, placed in the Top 15, becoming the first Slovenian semifinalist at the Miss Universe pageant in history.

Titleholders

The winner of Miss Universe Slovenia represents her country at the Miss Universe. On occasion, when the winner does not qualify (due to age) a runner-up is sent.

Municipality Ranking

Notes

References

External links
 www.miss-universe-slovenija.si

 
Beauty pageants in Slovenia
Recurring events established in 2001
Slovenian awards
Slovenia